The 1990 Ball State Cardinals football team was an American football team that represented Ball State University in the Mid-American Conference (MAC) during the 1990 NCAA Division I-A football season. In its sixth season under head coach Paul Schudel, the team compiled a 7–4 record (5–3 against conference opponents) and finished in a tie for third place out of ten teams in the MAC. The team played its home games at Ball State Stadium in Muncie, Indiana.

The team's statistical leaders included Mike Neu with 1,004 passing yards, Bernie Parmalee with 1,010 rushing yards, Mike LeSure with 398 receiving yards, and Kenny Stucker with 66 points scored.

Schedule

References

Ball State
Ball State Cardinals football seasons
Ball State Cardinals football